A dry run or a test run is an act committed by a terrorist organization without carrying out any actual terrorism in an attempt to determine whether a technique they are planning to use will be successful. The dry run is part of the rehearsal for a terrorist act, and is often the immediate precursor to the attack. It may include attempting to smuggle weapons or other items to be used in the attack past a security checkpoint to determine whether this will be noticed, or monitoring the reactions of security personnel to the actions that would occur during a real attack.

The dry run is considered to be the heart of the planning stages of the terrorist attack. It is the method by which strengths and weaknesses in the plot are exposed to the terrorists, unforeseen obstacles can be detected, and the techniques are refined. Sometimes, multiple dry runs are conducted in an effort to perfect the ultimate attack.

Suspicious signs
The following are suspicious signs a dry run may be occurring:
Appearing out-of-place
Sitting in car and observing operations for no apparent reason
Photography or videotaping with no obvious reason or illegally
Monitoring of a police radio frequency and observing response times to calls
Mapping out routes to determine timing of traffic flow and lights
Attempting to learn inside information about the operations of a place
Abandoning object(s), such as pieces of luggage

Notable reports of dry runs
In 2004 a group of Syrian musicians boarded Northwest Airlines Flight 327. Some passengers were alarmed by the men, including Annie Jacobsen who brought the flight to national attention. She described the group of men's behavior as consistent with a dry run. Investigating authorities including the FBI concluded there was no terrorist threat.
In 2006, British authorities uncovered a plot in which suspected terrorists were making a dry run in an attempt to make bombs out of peroxide that could be ignited with an electronic device. This led to restrictions internationally on carrying liquids on aircraft.
Investigators believe that the Yemen branch of al-Qaeda may have been conducting a dry run with shipments they made in 2010 on cargo aircraft in preparation for the 2010 transatlantic aircraft bomb plot.

References

Terrorism tactics
Smuggling